Polyschides is a genus of gadilid tusk shell (scaphopod).

Species
 Polyschides andersoni Lamprell & Healy, 1998
 Polyschides arnaudi Scarabino, 1995
 Polyschides arnoensis Maxwell, 1992 †
 Polyschides carolinensis (Bush, 1885)
 Polyschides cayrei Scarabino, 2008
 Polyschides cuspidatus (Nicklès, 1979)
 Polyschides fausta Kuroda, Habe & Oyama, 1971
 Polyschides foweyensis (Henderson, 1920)
 Polyschides gibbosus (Verco, 1911)
 Polyschides grandis (Verrill, 1884)
 Polyschides kaiyomaruae Okutani, 1975
 Polyschides kapuaensis Maxwell, 1992 †
 Polyschides miamiensis (Henderson, 1920)
 Polyschides nedallisoni (Emerson, 1978)
 Polyschides nitidus (Henderson, 1920)
 Polyschides noronhensis Simone, 2009
 Polyschides olivi (Scacchi, 1835)
 Polyschides pelamidae Chistikov, 1979
 Polyschides portoricensis (Henderson, 1920)
 Polyschides quadrifissatus (Pilsbry & Sharp, 1898)
 Polyschides rushii (Pilsbry & Sharp, 1898)
 Polyschides sakuraii (Kuroda & Habe in Habe, 1961)
 Polyschides spectabilis (A. E. Verrill, 1885)
 Polyschides sutherlandi Lamprell & Healy, 1998
 Polyschides tetraschistus (Watson, 1879)
 Polyschides tetrodon (Pilsbry & Sharp, 1898)
 Polyschides vietnamicus Chistikov, 1979
 Polyschides wareni Scarabino, 2008
 Polyschides xavante Caetano & Absalão, 2005
Synonyms
 Polyschides agassizii (Dall, 1881): synonym of Gadila agassizii (Dall, 1881)
 Polyschides bushiae (Dall, 1889): synonym of Gadila bushii (Dall, 1889)
 Polyschides californicus (Pilsbry & Sharp, 1898): synonym of Cadulus californicus Pilsbry & Sharp, 1898
 Polyschides elongatus (Henderson, 1920): synonym of Gadila elongata (Henderson, 1920)
 Polyschides pandionis (Verrill & S. Smith [in Verrill], 1880): synonym of Gadila pandionis (A. E. Verrill & S. Smith, 1880)
 Polyschides pelamide [sic]: synonym of Polyschides pelamidae Chistikov, 1979 (misspelling)
 Polyschides poculum (Dall, 1889): synonym of Gadila pocula (Dall, 1889)
 Polyschides poculus (Dall, 1889): synonym of Gadila pocula (Dall, 1889) (new combination)
 Polyschides summa Okutani, 1964: synonym of Siphonodentalium summa (Okutani, 1964) (original combination)
 Polyschides tetraschistum (R. B. Watson, 1879): synonym of Polyschides tetraschistus (R. B. Watson, 1879)
 Polyschides tolmiei (Dall, 1897): synonym of Gadila tolmiei  (Dall, 1897)

References 

 Spencer, H.G., Marshall, B.A. & Willan, R.C. (2009). Checklist of New Zealand living Mollusca. Pp 196-219. in: Gordon, D.P. (ed.) New Zealand inventory of biodiversity. Volume one. Kingdom Animalia: Radiata, Lophotrochozoa, Deuterostomia. Canterbury University Press, Christchurch.

External links
 Pilsbry, H. A. & Sharp, B. (1897-1898). Manual of conchology, structural and systematic, with illustrations of the species. Ser. 1. Vol. 17: Scaphopoda. pp i-xxxii, 1-348, pls 1-48. Philadelphia, published by the Conchological Section, Academy of Natural Sciences.
 Henderson, J. B. (1920). A monograph of the East American scaphopod mollusks. United States National Museum Bulletin. 111(20): 1-177

Scaphopods